Arsenura pandora is a moth of the family Saturniidae. It is known from Brazil.

One of Arsenura pandora's close relatives is Arsenura armida, which is also found in Brazil.

Arsenurinae
Moths of South America
Moths described in 1836
Taxa named by Johann Christoph Friedrich Klug